Anne Barnéoud (born 31 October 1983) is a French para table tennis player who competes in international level events. She is a three time World bronze medalist, double European team champion, she has won multiple medals in team events with Thu Kamkasomphou. She works as a police commissioner.

References

External links
 
 

1983 births
Living people
People from Saint-Martin-d'Hères
Sportspeople from Lyon
Paralympic table tennis players of France
Table tennis players at the 2008 Summer Paralympics
Table tennis players at the 2012 Summer Paralympics
Table tennis players at the 2016 Summer Paralympics
Medalists at the 2008 Summer Paralympics
French police officers
French female table tennis players
Paralympic medalists in table tennis
Paralympic bronze medalists for France
Table tennis players at the 2020 Summer Paralympics
Sportspeople from Isère
21st-century French women